Neil McDonald may refer to:

 Neil McDonald (chess player) (born 1967), English chess grandmaster
 Neil McDonald (footballer) (born 1965), English association footballer
 Neil McDonald (born 1922), Australian rear admiral, Deputy Chief of Navy 1978–1979

See also
Neil Macdonald (born 1957), Canadian journalist
Neal McDonald (born 1963), British sailor